Augmentation of a global navigation satellite system (GNSS) is a method of improving the navigation system's attributes, such as precision, reliability, and availability, through the integration of external information into the calculation process. There are many such systems in place, and they are generally named or described based on how the GNSS sensor receives the external information. Some systems transmit additional information about sources of error (such as clock drift, ephemeris, or ionospheric delay), others provide direct measurements of how much the signal was off in the past, while a third group provides additional vehicle information to be integrated in the calculation process.

Satellite-based augmentation system 

Satellite-based augmentation systems (SBAS) support wide-area or regional augmentation through the use of additional satellite-broadcast messages. Using measurements from the ground stations, correction messages are created and sent to one or more satellites for broadcast to end users as differential signal. SBAS is sometimes synonymous with WADGPS, wide-area differential GPS.

The GBAS and SBAS that have been implemented or proposed include:
 The Wide Area Augmentation System (WAAS), operated by the United States Federal Aviation Administration (FAA).
 The European Geostationary Navigation Overlay Service (EGNOS), operated by the ESSP (on behalf of EU's GSA).
 The Multi-functional Satellite Augmentation System (MSAS), operated by Japan's Ministry of Land, Infrastructure and Transport Japan Civil Aviation Bureau (JCAB).
 The Quasi-Zenith Satellite System (QZSS), operated by Japan, started initial operations in November 2018.
 The GPS-Aided GEO Augmented Navigation (GAGAN), operated by the Airports Authority of India.
 The System for Differential Corrections and Monitoring (SDCM), operated by Russia's Roscosmos.
 The BeiDou Satellite-Based Augmentation System (BDSBAS), proposed by China.
 The Southern Positioning Augmentation Network (SouthPAN), being developed by Australia and New Zealand with initial services expected in 2022.
 The Wide Area GPS Enhancement (WAGE), operated by the United States Department of Defense for use by military and authorized receivers.
 The commercial StarFire navigation system, operated by John Deere and C-Nav Positioning Solutions (Oceaneering).
 The commercial Starfix DGPS System and OmniSTAR system, operated by Fugro.
 The commercial Atlas GNSS Global L-Band Correction Service system, operated by Hemisphere GNSS.
 The GPS·C, short for GPS Correction, was a differential GPS data source for most of Canada, maintained by the Canadian Active Control System, part of Natural Resources Canada now decommissioned.

Ground-based augmentation system 

Ground-Based Augmentation System (GBAS) provides Differential GPS (DGPS) corrections and integrity verification near an airport, providing approaches e.g. for runways that do not have ILSs.
Reference receivers in surveyed positions measure GPS deviations and calculate corrections emitted at 2 Hz through VHF data broadcast (VDB) within .
One GBAS supports up to 48 approaches and covers many runway ends with more installation flexibility than an ILS with localizer and glideslope antennas at each end.
A GBAS can provide multiple approaches to reduce wake turbulence and improve resilience, maintaining availability and operations continuity.

In December 2008, the New York Port Authority invested $2.5 million to install a GBAS at Newark Airport (EWR)  with Continental (now United) equipping 15 aircraft for $1.1 million while the FAA committed $2.5 million to assess the technology.
Honeywell’s SLS-4000 GBAS design was approved by the FAA in September 2009 and is still the only one.
It offers Cat. 1 instrument landings with a  decision height and can be upgraded to a  Cat. 2  with real-time monitoring of ionospheric conditions through SBAS, while the more precise Cat. 3 SLS-5000 is waiting for compatible airliners.
The first installations were approved in EWR in 2012 and Houston / IAH in 2013.
The Port Authority recommends a GBAS for New York JFK and LaGuardia (LGA) to alleviate congestion.
Newark and Houston GBAS were upgraded to Cat. 2, Seattle-Tacoma, San Francisco SFO, JFK and LGA are expected next.

Among the 20 Honeywell GBAS installations worldwide, the other U.S. installations are: Honeywell's test facility in Johnson County, Kansas; the FAA Technical Center at Atlantic City International Airport, New Jersey; Boeing's test facility in Grant County, Washington; the B787 plant in Charleston International, South Carolina; and Anoka County–Blaine Airport near Minneapolis.
Airports equipped in Europe are Bremen, Frankfurt, Málaga and Zurich.
in Asia-Pacific, airport with installations are Chennai, Kuala Lumpur, Melbourne, Seoul-Gimpo, Shanghai-Pudong and Sydney.
Other locations are St. Helena in the South Atlantic, Punta Cana in the Dominican Republic and Rio de Janeiro–Galeão.
There are around 100 Cat. 1 GBAS landing systems (GLS) installations in Russia with Russian-specific technology.

In the US, GBAS was previously known as the Local-area augmentation system while a SBAS with a ground references network providing GPS corrections is called WAAS.

In the US, there were more WAAS LPV approaches reaching  than Cat. 1 ILS approaches by March 2018.
1 GBAS costs $3–4 million; and $700,000 more for Cat. 2.

By Spring 2018, Boeing delivered 3,500 GLS-capable airliners, with 5,000 on order: GLS Cat. 2/3 is standard on the Boeing 747-8, 787 and 777 while GLS Cat. 1 is optional on the 737NG/MAX and GLS Cat. 2/3 will be offered from 2020.
Airbus offers GLS Cat. 1 with autoland on the A320, A330, A350 and A380.

The FAA’s NextGen promotes GBAS and GLS to increase airport capacity and to lower noise and weather delays.
Boeing prefers FAA support than funding while the National Air Traffic Controllers Association argues rigid approaches will lower traffic management flexibility, losing throughput and capacity, a viewpoint shared by Delta Air Lines.
Some ICAO members vetter GBAS Approach Service Types-D (GAST-D) supporting Cat. 2/3 approach and landing.

There are stricter Safety requirements on GBAS systems relative to SBAS systems since GBAS is intended mainly for the landing phase where real-time accuracy and signal integrity control is critical, especially when weather deteriorates to the extent that there is no visibility (CAT-I/II/III conditions) for which SBAS is not intended or suitable.

Beyond airfields 
The US Nationwide Differential GPS System (NDGPS) was an augmentation system for users on U.S. land and waterways. It was replaced by NASA's Global Differential GPS (GDGPS) system, which supports a wide range of GNSS networks beyond GPS. The same GDGPS system underlies WAAS and A-GNSS implementation in the US.

Ground stations may also be used to accumulate continuous GNSS observations to achieve post-hoc correction of data to the centimeter level. Two example systems are the US Continuously Operating Reference Stations (CORS) and the International GNSS Service (IGS).

Aircraft-based augmentation system (ABAS) 
The augmentation may also take the form of additional information from navigation sensors being blended into the position calculation, or internal algorithms that improve the navigation performance. Many times the additional avionics operate via separate principles from the GNSS and are not necessarily subject to the same sources of error or interference. A system such as this is referred to as an aircraft-based augmentation system (ABAS) by the ICAO. The most widely used form of ABAS is receiver autonomous integrity monitoring (RAIM), which uses redundant GPS signals to ensure the integrity of the position solution, and to detect faulty signals.

Additional sensors may include:
 eLORAN receivers
 Automated celestial navigation systems
 Inertial navigation systems
 Distance measuring equipment, often multiple systems are used to create a positional fix (DME/DME). Can also be used with INS (DME/DME/INS).
 Simple dead reckoning systems (composed of a gyro compass and a distance measurement)

See also 
 Assisted GPS (A-GPS)
 GNSS enhancement
Satellite navigation

References

External links
 Airservices Australia GBAS and GNSS website
 US Government page on GPS augmentation systems
 Canada to Decommission DGPS System
 flygls.net lists all GLS sites worldwide

Satellite navigation
Satellite-based augmentation systems

ru:Системы дифференциальной коррекции#Спутниковая система дифференциальной коррекции